Peak minerals marks the point in time when the largest production of a mineral will occur in an area, with production declining in subsequent years. While most mineral resources will not be exhausted in the near future, global extraction and production has become more challenging. Miners have found ways over time to extract deeper and lower grade ores with lower production costs. More than anything else, declining average ore grades are indicative of ongoing technological shifts that have enabled inclusion of more 'complex' processing – in social and environmental terms as well as economic – and structural changes in the minerals exploration industry and these have been accompanied by significant increases in identified Mineral Reserves.

Definition 
The concept of peak minerals offers a useful model for representing the changing impacts associated with processing declining resource qualities in the lead up to, and following, peak mineral production in a particular region within a certain time-frame.

Peak minerals provides an analytical framework within which the economic, social and environmental trajectories of a particular mining industry can be explored in relation to the continuing (and often increasing) production of mineral resources. It focuses consideration on the change in costs and impacts associated with processing easily accessible, lower cost ores before peak production of an individual mine or group of mines for a given mineral. It outlines how the economy might respond as processing becomes characterised by higher costs as the peak is approached and passed. Issues associated with the concept of peak minerals include:
 Average processed ore grades are in global decline for some minerals whilst production is increasing.
 Average discovered  ore grades (e.g., in porphyry copper deposits) have remained remarkably steady over the last 150 years.
 Structural changes in the minerals exploration industry and the recent focus on "brownfields" exploration
 Mining is extending to deeper, more remote deposits.
 Individual mines or mining provinces can eventually become exhausted, though changes in demand and mining technology can act to prolong their productive lives.

Resource depletion and recoverability 

Giurco et al. (2009) indicate that the debate about how to analytically describe resource depletion is ongoing. Traditionally, a fixed stock paradigm has been applied, but Tilton and Lagos (2007) suggest using an opportunity cost paradigm is better because the usable resource quantity is represented by price and the opportunity cost of using the resource. Unlike energy minerals such as coal or oil – or minerals used in a dissipative or metabolic fashion like phosphorus – most non-energy minerals and metals are unlikely to run out. Metals are inherently recyclable and more readily recoverable from end uses where the metal is used in a pure form and not transformed or dissipated; in addition, metal ore is accessible at a range of different grades. So, although metals are not facing exhaustion, they have become more challenging to obtain in the quantities that society demands, and the energy, environmental and social cost of acquiring them could constrain future increases in production and usage.

Peak oil 
Given increasing global population and rapidly growing consumption (especially in China and India), frameworks for the analysis of resource depletion can assist in developing appropriate responses. The most popular contemporary focus for resource depletion is oil (or petroleum) resources. In 1956, oil geologist M. King Hubbert famously predicted that conventional oil production from the lower 48 (mainland) states of the United States would peak by 1970 and then enter a terminal decline. This model was accurate in predicting the peak (although the peak year was 1971). This phenomenon is now commonly called 'peak oil', with peak production curves known as Hubbert Curves.

The concept of peak minerals is an extrapolation and extension of Hubbert's model of peak oil. Although widely cited for his predictions of peak oil, Hubbert intended to explore an appropriate response to the finite supply of oil, and framed this work within the context of increasing global population and rapidly growing consumption of oil.

In establishing the peak oil model, Hubbert was primarily focused on arguing that a planned transition was required to ensure future energy services.

World gold production has experienced multiple peaks due to new discoveries and new technologies.  Many mineral resources have exhibited logistic Hubbert-type production trends in the past, but have transitioned to exponential growth during the last 10–15 years, precluding reliable estimates of reserves from within the framework of the logistic model.

As extrapolating peak oil 
Only limited substantive work is currently undertaken to examine how the concepts and assumptions of peak oil can be extrapolated so as to be applied to minerals in general. When extrapolating peak oil to account for peak minerals and then utilising this analytical 'peak framework' as a general model of resource exploitation, several factors must be taken into consideration:
Accurate estimates of easily accessible proven reserves;
Political and market stability;
Affordable, stable prices for consumers and enticing profits for producers;
Exponentially increasing consumption;
Independent producers focused only on maximising their immediate profits;
Perceived abundance of and availability of other reserves (e.g. US, Middle Eastern).
In understanding how these factors are important for modelling peak minerals, it is important to consider assumptions concerning the modelling process, assumptions about production (particularly economic conditions), and the ability to make accurate estimates of resource quantity and quality and the potential of future exploration.

Cheap and easy in the past; costly and difficult in future 
Peak production poses a problem for resource rich countries like Australia, which have developed a comparative advantage in the global resources sector, which may diminish in the future. The costs of mining, once primarily reflected in economic terms, are increasingly being considered in social and environmental terms, although these are yet to meaningfully inform long-term decision-making in the sector. Such consideration is particularly important if the industry is seeking to operate in a socially, environmentally and economically sustainable manner into the next 30–50 years.

Benefits from dependence on the resource sector 
In 2008–09, minerals and fuel exports made up around 56% of Australia's total exports. Consequently, minerals play a major role in Australia's capacity to participate in international trade and contribute to the international strength of its currency. Whether this situation contributes to Australia's economic wealth or weakens its economic position is contested. While those supporting Australia's reliance on minerals cite the theory of comparative advantage, opponents suggest a reliance on resources leads to issues associated with 'Dutch disease' (a decline in other sectors of the economy associated with natural resource exploitation) and ultimately the hypothesised ‘resource curse’.

Threats from dependence on the resource sector 
Contrary to the theory of the comparative advantage, many mineral resource-rich countries are often outperformed by resource-poor countries. This paradox, where natural resource abundance actually has a negative impact on the growth of the national economy is termed the resource curse. After an initial economic boost, brought on by the booming minerals economy, negative impacts linked to the boom surpass the positive, causing economic activity to fall below the pre-resource windfall level.

Mineral supply and demand 
The economics of a commodity are generally determined by supply and demand. Mineral supply and demand will change dramatically as all costs (economic, technological, social and environmental) associated with production, processing and transportation of minerals increases with falling ore grades. These costs will ultimately influence the ability of companies to supply commodities, and the ability of consumers to purchase them. It is likely that social and environmental issues will increasingly drive economic costs associated with supply and demand patterns.

Economic scarcity as a constraint to mineral supply 
As neither overall stocks nor future markets are known, most economists normally do not consider physical scarcity as a good indicator for the availability of a resource for society. Economic scarcity has subsequently been introduced as a more valid approach to assess the supply of minerals. There are three commonly accepted measures for economic scarcity: the user costs associated with a resource, the real price of the resource, and the resource's extraction costs. These measures have historically externalised impacts of a social or environmental nature – so might be considered inaccurate measures of economic scarcity given increased environmental or social scrutiny in the mining industry. Internalisation of these costs will contribute to economic scarcity by increasing the user costs, the real price of the resource, and its extraction costs.

Demand for minerals 
While the ability to supply a commodity determines its availability as has been demonstrated, demand for minerals can also influence their availability. How minerals are used, where they are distributed and how, trade barriers, downstream use industries, substitution and recycling can potentially influence the demand for minerals, and ultimately their availability. While economists are cognisant of the role of demand as an availability driver, historically they have not considered factors besides depletion as having a long-term impact on mineral availability.

Future production 
There are a variety of indicators that show production will become more difficult and more expensive. Key environmental indicators that reflect increasingly expensive production are primarily associated with the decline in average ore grades of many minerals. This has consequences in mineral exploration, for mine depth, the energy intensity of mining, and the increasing quantity of waste rock.

Social context 
Different social issues must be addressed through time in relation to peak minerals at a national scale, and other issues manifest on the local scale.

As global mining companies seek to expand operations to access larger mining areas, competition with farmers for land and for scare water is likely to increase. Negative relationships with near neighbours influence companies' ability to establish and maintain a social license to operate within the community.

Access to identified resources is likely to become harder as questions are asked about the benefit from the regional economic development mining is reputed to bring.

See also
 Peak coal
 Peak copper
 Peak phosphorus
 Peak gas
 Peak uranium
 Asteroid mining
 Natural resource
 Environmental impact of mining
 Automated mining

References

External links 
 The Institute for Sustainable Futures
 Peak Minerals in Australia: a review of changing impacts and benefits 
 The Environmental Sustainability of Mining in Australia: Key Mega-Trends and Looming Constraints (Gavin Mudd, 2010)
 Will Sustainability Constraints Cause 'Peak Minerals'?
 Mineral Futures Discussion Paper: Sustainability Issues, Challenges and Opportunities
 The Global Phosphorus Research Initiative
 The Oil Drum: Ugo Bardi
 Peak Nothing: Recent Trends in Mineral Resource Production

Minerals
Minerals